Barby is a town in the Salzlandkreis district, in Saxony-Anhalt, Germany. It is situated on the left bank of the River Elbe, near the confluence with the Saale, approx.  southeast of Magdeburg. Since an administrative reform of 1 January 2010 it comprises the former municipalities of the Verwaltungsgemeinschaft Elbe-Saale, except for Gnadau, that joined Barby in September 2010. The Barby Ferry, a reaction ferry across the Elbe, links Barby with Zerbst-Walternienburg.

Geography
The town Barby consists of the following Ortschaften or municipal divisions:

Barby
Breitenhagen
Glinde
Gnadau
Groß Rosenburg
Lödderitz
Pömmelte
Sachsendorf
Tornitz
Wespen
Zuchau

History

The burgward of Barby was first mentioned in a 961 deed by German king Otto I. Since the 12th century, the area was enfeoffed to the Counts of Barby descending from nearby Arnstein, who achieved Imperial immediacy in 1497. Upon the extinction of the line in 1659, the County of Barby fell to the Duchy of Saxe-Weissenfels, ruled by a cadet branch of the electoral Saxon House of Wettin. When Duke Georg Albrecht of Saxe-Weissenfels died without issue in 1739, Barby fell to the Electorate of Saxony.  The Elector rented Barby to Count von Zinzendorf in repayment for a loan and Barby was for several decades the headquarters of the worldwide work of the Moravian Church as well as of its theological seminary.

Twin towns
Barby is twinned with:
  Schöppenstedt, Germany
  Aukštadvaris, Lithuania
  Pruchnik, Poland

Notable people 

Jakob Friedrich Fries (1773–1843), philosopher
Friedrich Schleiermacher (1768–1843), theologian and philosopher
Max Sering (1857-1939), economist
  (1892-1970), jurist and politician (FDP)
 Gottfried Wehling (1862–1913), architect

References

 
Salzlandkreis
Populated riverside places in Germany
Populated places on the Elbe